Jaeden Graham (born October 10, 1995) is an American football tight end who is a free agent. He played college football at Yale.

College career
As a senior at Yale, Graham was a first-team All-Ivy League honoree after starting 10 games and finishing the season with four touchdowns and 26 receptions.

Professional career

Atlanta Falcons
Graham was signed by the Atlanta Falcons as an undrafted free agent on June 1, 2018. He was waived on September 1, 2018, and was signed to the practice squad the next day. He signed a reserve/future contract with the Falcons on December 31, 2018.

Graham signed a contract extension with the Falcons on March 12, 2021. He was placed on injured reserve on August 5, 2021.

Philadelphia Eagles
Graham was signed by the Philadelphia Eagles on July 27, . He was placed on injured reserve on August 5, 2022. He was released on September 2.

References

External links
Atlanta Falcons bio
Yale Bulldogs bio

1995 births
Living people
American football tight ends
Atlanta Falcons players
Players of American football from Colorado
Sportspeople from Aurora, Colorado
Yale Bulldogs football players
Philadelphia Eagles players